"Suspicious Minds" is a song written and recorded by Mark James and made famous by Elvis Presley.

Suspicious Minds may also refer to:

Suspicious Minds (album), an anthology album (full name Suspicious Minds: The Memphis 1969 Anthology) a compilation of Elvis songs
"Suspicious Minds" (Desperate Housewives), a TV episode of Desperate Housewives
"Suspicious Minds" (Supergirl), an episode of Supergirl